The North West Shelf Operational Oceanographic System (NOOS) monitors physical, sedimentological and ecological variables for the North Sea area.  NOOS is operated by partners from the nine countries bordering the extended North Sea and European North West Shelf; Belgium, Denmark, France, Germany, Ireland, Netherlands, Norway, Sweden, and United Kingdom. Working collaboratively to develop and implement ocean observing systems in the area. Near real time and recent history sea levels are available to on their web site in map, graph or table format.

Membership
As of January 2008 NOOS had sixteen full members and four associate members.

Full Members:
 Bundesamt für Seeschifffahrt und Hydrographie (BSH), Germany
 Centre for Environment, Fisheries and Aquaculture Science (CEFAS), UK
 Danish Maritime Safety Administration (DaMSA), Denmark
 Danish Meteorological Institute (DMI), Denmark
 Flemish Authorities - MD&K Coastal Division, Belgium
 French Research Institute for Exploitation of the Sea (IFREMER), France
 Institute of Marine Research (IMR), Norway
 Koninklijk Nederlands Meteorologisch Instituut (KNMI), Netherlands
 Management Unit of the North Sea Mathematical Models (MUMM), Belgium
 Marine Institute, Ireland
 Met Office, UK
 National Institute for Coastal and Marine Management, Rijkswaterstaat (RIKZ), Netherlands
 Norwegian Meteorological Institute (MET Norway), Norway
 Proudman Oceanographic Laboratory (POL), UK
 Service Hydrographique et Oceanographique de la Marine (SHOM), France
 Swedish Meteorological and Hydrological Institute (SMHI), Sweden
Associate Members
 GKSS Forschungszentrum (GKSS), Germany
 Nansen Environmental and Remote Sensing Center (NERSC), Norway
 Norwegian Institute for Water Research (NIVA), Norway
 University of Oldenburg (Uni-Oldenburg), Germany

Further reading

References

External links 
 Home page

North Sea
Oceanography
Sea level